WBOF-LP (105.9 FM) is a radio station licensed to Fort Pierce, Florida, United States.  The station is currently owned by Faith Baptist Church of Fort Pierce, Florida.

The station broadcasts Conservative Christian talk programming including talk shows, sermons and a children's show on Saturdays.

References

External links
 

BOF
Fort Pierce, Florida
2005 establishments in Florida
Radio stations established in 2005
BOF-LP